The FIU Panthers college football team represents Florida International University (FIU) in the East Division of Conference USA (C-USA). The Panthers compete as part of the National Collegiate Athletic Association (NCAA) Division I Football Bowl Subdivision. The program has had five full-time head coaches, and one interm head coach since it began play during the 2002 season. Mike MacIntyre has served as the FIU head coach since December 2021.

The team has played more than 200 games over 17 seasons. In that time, only two Head Coaches have led the Panthers to postseason bowl games: Mario Cristobal and Butch Davis. FIU has a 2-2 record in four bowl games in which they have competed. The Panthers have been Co-Conference Champions once: in 2010 by Cristobal, during the Panther’s time in the Sun Belt Conference.

Cristobal spent the most seasons as the Panthers head coach and took the program to its only bowl games until Davis. The highest winning percentage by any coach is by Butch Davis, and the lowest winning percentage for any coach is Ron Turner, who went 10-30 (.250) in four seasons.

Head coaches

Key

List of head coaches

Notes

References

FIU

FIU Panthers football coaches